Six warships of the Royal Navy have been named HMS Marlborough after the Duke of Marlborough:
 , a second rate, renamed Marlborough 1706; fought in the Seven Years' War; present in Sir George Pocock's fleet at the taking of Havana from the Spanish 1762; foundered at sea 1762.
 , a third rate built 1767; fought in the American Revolutionary War; heavily damaged in the Battle of the Glorious First of June 1794; wrecked 1800.
 , a third rate built 1807; broken up 1835.
 , a first rate screw ship built 1855; renamed Vernon II 1904; sank on her way to being broken up 1924.
 , an  built 1912; fought in the Battle of Jutland 1916; decommissioned 1932. This ship evacuated surviving members of the Russian royal family, the Romanovs, from the Crimea during the Russian Civil War.
 , a Type 23 frigate launched 1989; sold to the Chilean Navy 2008; renamed Almirante Condell.
HMS Marlborough was also an Electrical Training shore station in Eastbourne during and shortly after World War II.

Battle honours
Ships named Marlborough have earned the following battle honours:
Martinique, 1762
Havana, 1762
St Vincent, 1780
The Saints, 1782
First of June, 1794
Jutland, 1916

References

Literature
 The book HMS Marlborough Will Enter Harbour by Nicholas Monsarrat featured a fictional sloop named HMS Marlborough in World War II.

Royal Navy ship names